Load factor may refer to:

 Load factor (aeronautics), the ratio of the lift of an aircraft to its weight
 Load factor (computer science), the ratio of the number of records to the number of addresses within a data structure
 Load factor (electrical), the average power divided by the peak power over a period of time
Capacity factor, the ratio of actual energy output to the theoretical maximum possible in a power station
 Passenger load factor, the ratio of revenue passenger miles to available seat miles of a particular transportation operation (e.g. a flight)
Factor loadings in statistics, the exposure to specific factors or components in Factor Analysis or Principal Component Analysis

See also 
 Add-on factor - sometimes called load factor